The Leader of the Opposition (officially the Leader of the Opposition of the Republic of Trinidad and Tobago) is the leader of the largest political party in the House of Representatives that is not in government.

The Leader of the Opposition is a member of the House of Representatives, and is appointed by the President of Trinidad and Tobago.

The current Leader of the Opposition is Kamla Persad-Bissessar, leader of the United National Congress.

Leaders of the Opposition of Trinidad and Tobago

See also
Politics of Trinidad and Tobago
President of Trinidad and Tobago
List of prime ministers of Trinidad and Tobago

Footnotes

References

External links
Trinidad and Tobago Parliament - Leaders of the Opposition

Politics of Trinidad and Tobago
Leaders of the Opposition
Trinidad and Tobago